Tiffany Parham, known professionally as Tiffany Foxx, is an American recording artist. Born in St. Louis, Missouri, Foxx first garnered recognition in 2005 after appearing on Snoop Dogg's compilation album Welcome to tha Chuuch: Da Album. In 2010, she formed a hip-hop group "June 5th". They released the mixtape HERstory before Foxx decided to pursue her solo career.

In 2012, rapper Lil' Kim signed Foxx to her record label International Rock Star Records. Since then she has released three mixtapes, Yellow Tape, Goal Diggers and King Foxx. She also appeared in the fourth season of the VH1 reality show Love & Hip Hop: Atlanta. In 2017, Foxx appeared on Season 2 Episode 7  of WE TV dating show Million Dollar Matchmaker with Patti Stanger.

Career

2009–11: June 5
"June 5" was a female rap group from St. Louis, Missouri formed in 2009 signed under Mizay Entertainment that included (in addition to Foxx) such as Scar Ladon, and Brooke Holladay. The group came about when all three girls met on June 5, 2009.

Foxx stated “When we first came together we met because we were all in the business, So we joined forces on June 5th and became the group June 5th.” On March 24, 2010, June 5 released their first mixtape called, HERstory.

2012–present: Solo career

In 2012, rapper Lil' Kim signed Foxx to her label, International Rock Star Records. Together, the two have released two songs, "Twisted" and "Jay-Z", both of which have accompanying music videos. In the music video for "Twisted", Miley Cyrus supported her friends Lil' Kim and Foxx by appearing in the music video.

On October 15, 2013, Foxx appeared on the BET Hip Hop Awards BET cypher. On Christmas Day, Foxx revealed the artwork for her upcoming mixtape titled King Foxx which was released on Valentine's Day. Foxx also joined the cast of VH1's Love & Hip Hop: Atlanta, which premiered on April 20, 2015.

In 2018, Foxx released singles "War Zone" and "If I Do It" which were included in her upcoming album.

On November 21, 2018, Tiffany Foxx released Bad Bitch Commandments.

Discography

Mixtapes

Promotional singles

Guest appearances

Videography

Solo – Music videos

Featured artist – Music videos

Filmography

Films

Television

Commercials

References

American women rappers
African-American women rappers
Living people
Rappers from St. Louis
Participants in American reality television series
21st-century American rappers
21st-century American women musicians
21st-century African-American women
21st-century African-American musicians
20th-century African-American people
20th-century African-American women
21st-century women rappers
1981 births